Almedin Civa (born 27 April 1972) is Bosnian retired footballer who is the manager of 1. FC Lokomotive Leipzig. Before that he worked as sporting director at SV Babelsberg 03.

Playing career
Civa, who played as a defender or midfielder, has spent his entire career in Germany, mainly playing in and around Berlin. He made 71 appearances in the 2. Bundesliga, for Tennis Borussia Berlin, KFC Uerdingen 05, and SV Babelsberg 03. He holds the Babelsberg's most appearances record with 261 league matches.

Managerial statistics

References

External links
 

1972 births
Living people
People from Breza, Bosnia and Herzegovina
Bosniaks of Bosnia and Herzegovina
Association football defenders
Bosnia and Herzegovina footballers
Tennis Borussia Berlin players
Füchse Berlin Reinickendorf players
1. FC Union Berlin players
KFC Uerdingen 05 players
SV Babelsberg 03 players
1. FC Lokomotive Leipzig players
FC Sachsen Leipzig players
Hallescher FC players
SV Yeşilyurt players
2. Bundesliga players
Regionalliga players
Oberliga (football) players
3. Liga players
Bosnia and Herzegovina football managers
SV Babelsberg 03 managers
1. FC Lokomotive Leipzig managers
3. Liga managers
Bosnia and Herzegovina expatriate footballers
Bosnia and Herzegovina expatriate football managers
Bosnia and Herzegovina expatriate sportspeople in Germany
Expatriate footballers in Germany
Expatriate football managers in Germany